Sydney Brenner  (13 January 1927 – 5 April 2019) was a South African biologist. In 2002, he shared the Nobel Prize in Physiology or Medicine with H. Robert Horvitz and Sir John E. Sulston. Brenner made significant contributions to work on the genetic code, and other areas of molecular biology while working in the Medical Research Council (MRC) Laboratory of Molecular Biology in Cambridge, England. He established the roundworm Caenorhabditis elegans as a model organism for the investigation of developmental biology, and founded the Molecular Sciences Institute in Berkeley, California, United States.

Education and early life

Brenner was born in the town of Germiston in the then Transvaal (today in Gauteng), South Africa, on 13 January 1927. His parents, Leah (née Blecher) and Morris Brenner, were Jewish immigrants. His father, a cobbler, came to South Africa from Lithuania in 1910, and his mother from Riga, Latvia, in 1922. He had one sister, Phyllis.

He was educated at Germiston High School and the University of the Witwatersrand. Having joined university at the age of 15, it was noted during his second year that he would be too young to qualify for the practice of medicine at the conclusion of his six-year medical course, and he was therefore allowed to complete a Bachelor of Science degree in Anatomy and Physiology. He stayed on for two more years doing an Honours degree and then an MSc degree, supporting himself by working part-time as a laboratory technician. During this time he was taught by Joel Mandelstam, Raymond Dart and Robert Broom. His master thesis was in the field of cytogenetics. In 1951 he received the Bachelor of Medicine, Bachelor of Surgery (MBBCh) degree.

Brenner received an 1851 Exhibition Scholarship from the Royal Commission for the Exhibition of 1851 which enabled him to complete a Doctor of Philosophy (DPhil) degree at the University of Oxford as a postgraduate student of Exeter College, Oxford, supervised by Cyril Hinshelwood.

Career and research

Following his DPhil, Brenner did postdoctoral research at the University of California, Berkeley. He spent the next 20 years at the Laboratory of Molecular Biology in Cambridge. There, during the 1960s, he contributed to molecular biology, then an emerging field. In 1976 he joined the Salk Institute in California.

Together with Jack Dunitz, Dorothy Hodgkin, Leslie Orgel, and Beryl M. Oughton, he was one of the first people in April 1953 to see the model of the structure of DNA, constructed by Francis Crick and James Watson; at the time he and the other scientists were working at the University of Oxford's Chemistry Department. All were impressed by the new DNA model, especially Brenner, who subsequently worked with Crick in the Cavendish Laboratory at the University of Cambridge and the newly opened Medical Research Council (MRC) Laboratory of Molecular Biology (LMB). According to Beryl Oughton, later Rimmer, they all travelled together in two cars once Dorothy Hodgkin announced to them that they were off to Cambridge to see the model of the structure of DNA.

Brenner made several seminal contributions to the emerging field of molecular biology in the 1960s (see Phage group). The first was to prove that all overlapping genetic coding sequences were impossible. This insight separated the coding function from structural constraints as proposed in a clever code by George Gamow. This led Francis Crick to propose the concept of a hypothetical molecule  (later identified as transfer RNA or tRNA) that transfer the genetic information from RNA to proteins. Brenner gave the name "adaptor hypothesis" in 1955. The physical separation between the anticodon and the amino acid on a tRNA is the basis for the unidirectional flow of information in coded biological systems. This is commonly known as the central dogma of molecular biology, i.e. information flows from nucleic acid to protein and never from protein to nucleic acid. Following this adaptor insight, Brenner conceived of the concept of messenger RNA during an April 1960 conversation with Crick and François Jacob, and together with Jacob and Matthew Meselson went on to prove its existence later that summer. Then, with Crick, Leslie Barnett, and Richard J. Watts-Tobin, Brenner genetically demonstrated the triplet nature of the code of protein translation through the Crick, Brenner, Barnett, Watts-Tobin et al. experiment of 1961, which discovered frameshift mutations. Brenner collaborating with Sarabhai, Stretton and Bolle in 1964, using amber mutants defective in the bacteriophage T4D major head protein, showed that the nucleotide sequence of the gene is co-linear with the amino acid sequence of the encoded polypeptide chain.

Together with the decoding work of Marshall Warren Nirenberg and others, the discovery of the triplet nature of the genetic code was critical to deciphering the code. Barnett helped set up Sydney Brenner's laboratory in Singapore, many years later.

Brenner, with George Pieczenik, created the first computer matrix analysis of nucleic acids using TRAC, which Brenner continued to use. Crick, Brenner, Klug and Pieczenik returned to their early work on deciphering the genetic code with a pioneering paper on the origin of protein synthesis, where constraints on mRNA and tRNA co-evolved allowing for a five-base interaction with a flip of the anticodon loop, and thereby creating a triplet code translating system without requiring a ribosome. This model requires a partially overlapping code. The published scientific paper is extremely rare in that its collaborators include three authors who independently became Nobel laureates.

Brenner then focused on establishing a free-living roundworm Caenorhabditis elegans as a model organism for the investigation of animal development including neural development. He chose this 1-millimeter-long soil roundworm mainly because it is simple, is easy to grow in bulk populations, and turned out to be quite convenient for genetic analysis. One of the key methods for identifying important function genes was the screen for roundworms that had some functional defect, such as being uncoordinated, leading to the identification of new sets of proteins, such as the set of UNC proteins. For this work, he shared the 2002 Nobel Prize in Physiology or Medicine with H. Robert Horvitz and John Sulston. The title of his Nobel lecture in December 2002, "Nature's Gift to Science", is a homage to this nematode; in it, he considered that having chosen the right organism turned out to be as important as having addressed the right problems to work on. In fact, the C. elegans community has grown rapidly in recent decades with researchers working on a wide spectrum of problems.

Brenner founded the Molecular Sciences Institute in Berkeley, California in 1996.  he was associated with the Salk Institute, the Institute of Molecular and Cell Biology, the Singapore Biomedical Research Council, the Janelia Farm Research Campus, and the Howard Hughes Medical Institute. In August 2005, Brenner was appointed president of the Okinawa Institute of Science and Technology. He was also on the Board of Scientific Governors at The Scripps Research Institute, as well as being Professor of Genetics there. A scientific biography of Brenner was written by Errol Friedberg in the US, for publication by Cold Spring Harbor Laboratory Press in 2010.

Known for his penetrating scientific insight and acerbic wit, Brenner, for many years, authored a regular column ("Loose Ends") in the journal Current Biology. This column was so popular that "Loose ends from Current Biology", a compilation, was published by Current Biology Ltd. and became a collectors' item. Brenner wrote "A Life in Science", a paperback published by BioMed Central. He is also noted for his generosity with ideas and the great number of students and colleagues his ideas have stimulated.

In 2017, Brenner co-organized a seminal lecture series in Singapore describing ten logarithmic scales of time from the Big Bang to the present, spanning the appearance of multicellular life forms, the evolution of humans, and the emergence of language, culture and technology. Prominent scientists and thinkers, including W. Brian Arthur, Svante Pääbo, Helga Nowotny and Jack Szostak, spoke during the lecture series. In 2018, the lectures were adapted into a popular science book titled Sydney Brenner's 10-on-10: The Chronicles of Evolution, published by Wildtype Books.

Brenner also gave four lectures on the history of molecular biology, its impact on neuroscience and the great scientific questions that lie ahead. The lectures were adapted into the book, In the Spirit of Science: Lectures by Sydney Brenner on DNA, Worms and Brains.

American plan and European plan

The "American plan" and "European plan" were proposed by Sydney Brenner as competing models for the way brain cells determine their neural functions. According to the European plan (sometimes referred to as the British plan), the function of cells is determined by their genetic lineage. According to the American plan, a cell's function is determined by the function of its neighbours after cell migration. Further research has shown that most species follow some combination of these methods, albeit in varying degrees, to transfer information to new cells.

Awards and honours

Brenner received numerous awards and honours, including:

 Fellow of King's College, Cambridge since 1959.
 Elected an EMBO Member in 1964.
 Elected a Fellow of the Royal Society (FRS) of London in 1965.
 Elected member of the American Academy of Arts and Sciences in 1966.
 William Bate Hardy Prize in 1969.
 Albert Lasker Medical Research Award in 1971.
 Royal Medal from the Royal Society in 1974.
 Elected member of the United States National Academy of Sciences in 1977.
 Gairdner Foundation International Award in 1978 and again in 1991.
 Elected member of the American Philosophical Society in 1979.
 Krebs Medal in 1980.
 Novartis Medal and Prize of the Biochemical Society in 1980.
 Rosenstiel Award in 1986.
 Member of the Order of the Companions of Honour in 1986.
 Harvey Prize in 1987.
 Genetics Society of America Medal in 1987.
 Kyoto Prize in 1990.
 Copley Medal in 1991.
 King Faisal International Prize in Medicine in 1992.
 The Dendrobium Sydney Brenner named in 1998 on the occasion of his visit to Singapore's National Orchid Garden the prior year.
 Nobel prize in Physiology or Medicine in 2002.
 Dan David Prize in 2002. directed by Professor Gad Barzilai
 March of Dimes Prize in Developmental Biology in 2002.
 In recognition of his pioneering role in starting what is now a global research community that work on C. elegans, another closely related nematode was given the scientific name Caenorhabditis brenneri.
 The National Science and Technology Medal by the Agency for Science, Technology and Research awarded Brenner in 2006 for his distinguished and strategic contributions to the development of Singapore's scientific capability and culture, particularly in the biomedical sciences sector.
 In 2008, the University of the Witwatersrand named the Sydney Brenner Institute for Molecular Bioscience (SBIMB) in his honour.
 Grand Cordon of the Order of the Rising Sun in 2017.
 In 2019, a newly discovered species of bobtail squid, Euprymna brenneri, was named in his honour.

Personal life

Brenner was married to May Brenner (subsequently Balkind) from December 1952 until her death in January 2010; their children include Belinda, Carla, Stefan, and his stepson Jonathan Balkind from his wife's first marriage to Marcus Balkind. He lived in Ely, Cambridgeshire. He was an atheist.

Brenner died on 5 April 2019, in Singapore, at the age of 92.

References

Further reading

 Soraya De Chadarevian; Designs For Life: Molecular Biology After World War II, CUP 2002, 444 pp; 
 Francis Crick; What Mad Pursuit: A Personal View of Scientific Discovery (Basic Books reprint edition, 1990) 
 Georgina Ferry; 'Max Perutz and the Secret of Life', (Chatto & Windus 2007) 352pp, . For uncaptioned picture.
Robert Olby; Francis Crick: Hunter of Life's Secrets, Cold Spring Harbor Laboratory Press, published on 25 August 2009.
 Max Perutz; What a Time I am Having: Selected Letters., CSHL Press 2008, 506pp . For captioned picture.
Matt Ridley; Francis Crick: Discoverer of the Genetic Code (Eminent Lives) first published in June 2006 in the US and then in the UK September 2006, by HarperCollins Publishers; 192 pp, ; in paperback, by Atlas Books (with index), .
 Sydney Brenner Collection Cold Spring Harbor Laboratory Archives
Lewis Wolpert; How We Live and Why We Die, Faber and Faber 2009, 240 pp;

External links

 Interviewed by Alan Macfarlane 23 August 2007 (video)
  including the Nobel Lecture 8 December 2002 Nature's Gift to Science

1927 births
2019 deaths
Nobel laureates in Physiology or Medicine
South African Nobel laureates
South African emigrants to the United Kingdom
Jewish biologists
South African biologists
South African geneticists
Jewish geneticists
History of genetics
People from Germiston

University of the Witwatersrand alumni
Alumni of King's College, Cambridge
Alumni of Exeter College, Oxford
Fellows of King's College, Cambridge
Fellows of Exeter College, Oxford
Scripps Research faculty
South African biotechnologists
Caenorhabditis elegans
Phage workers

Fellows of the Academy of Medical Sciences (United Kingdom)
Fellows of the Royal Society
Foreign associates of the National Academy of Sciences
Kyoto laureates in Advanced Technology
Members of the European Molecular Biology Organization
Members of the French Academy of Sciences
Members of the German Academy of Sciences Leopoldina
Members of the Order of the Companions of Honour
Recipients of the Albert Lasker Award for Basic Medical Research
Recipients of the Copley Medal
Royal Medal winners

Jewish atheists
Jewish scientists
South African atheists
South African Jews
South African people of Latvian-Jewish descent
South African people of Lithuanian-Jewish descent
White South African people
Honorary Citizens of Singapore
Salk Institute for Biological Studies people

Members of the American Philosophical Society
Members of the National Academy of Medicine